Schjoldager is a Danish surname. Notable people with the surname include:

 Eva Gram Schjoldager (born 1966), Danish actress and child star
 Mette Schjoldager (born 1977), Danish badminton player

Danish-language surnames